Iranildo is a male given name. Notable people with the name include:
Iranildo (born 1976), Brazilian footballer
Iranildo Conceição Espíndola (born 1969), Brazilian para table tennis player

Masculine given names